is a railway station in the city of  Shinshiro, Aichi Prefecture, Japan, operated by Central Japan Railway Company (JR Tōkai).

Lines
Mikawa-Tōgō Station is served by the Iida Line, and is located 25.0 kilometers from the starting point of the line at Toyohashi Station.

Station layout
The station has one island platform connected to the station building by a level crossing.The station building has automated ticket machines, TOICA automated turnstiles and is unattended. The station building is modeled after a wooden palisade from the time of the Battle of Nagashino, which took place near the station.

Platforms

Adjacent stations

|-
!colspan=5|Central Japan Railway Company

Station history
On August 1, 1943, the Toyokawa Railway was nationalized along with some other local lines to form the Japanese Government Railways (JGR) Iida Line, and the station was renamed to its present name. Scheduled freight operations were discontinued in 1962. The station has been unattended since 1984. Along with its division and privatization of JNR on April 1, 1987, the station came under the control and operation of the Central Japan Railway Company. (JR Tōkai)

Surrounding area
 Yokohama Rubber Shichiro plant
 Noda Castle ruins

See also
 List of Railway Stations in Japan

References

External links

Railway stations in Japan opened in 1900
Railway stations in Aichi Prefecture
Iida Line
Stations of Central Japan Railway Company
Shinshiro, Aichi